Globe Janakantha Shilpa Paribar (GJSP) is one of the largest Bangladeshi conglomerates. The industries under this conglomerate include construction, engineering, electrical cables, information technology, printing, media etc. It was founded in 1969 by Mohammad Atikullah Khan Masud.

Small, medium and large family owned businesses dominate over Bangladesh's $100 billion ($288 billion in PPP GDP) economy, which has been growing at over 5 percent a year since 1995.

List of companies
 Globe Insecticides Ltd.
 Globe Metal Complex Ltd.
 Globe Cables Limited
 Janakantha, a popular daily newspaper in Bangladesh 
 Globe Khamar Prokalpa Ltd.
 Globe Construction Ltd.
 Globe Technologies Ltd.

See also
 List of companies of Bangladesh

References

External links
 GJSP corporate information

Mass media companies of Bangladesh
Manufacturing companies of Bangladesh